WHDO-CD, virtual channel 38 (UHF digital channel 36), is a low-powered, Class A Mega TV-affiliated television station licensed to Orlando, Florida, United States. The station is owned by Western Pacific Broadcast, LLC. Its transmitter is located near the SR-417 and Florida's Turnpike intersection, along with low-powered Azteca America affiliate WATV-LD and WURF's FM translator W279DI. It previously broadcast programming from Tuff TV until that network ceased operations on August 26, 2018.

External links

HDO-CD
Low-power television stations in the United States